James Ernest Davey (1890–1960) was a Northern Irish Presbyterian minister, historian and theologian who was acquitted on charges of heresy in 1927 and elected Moderator of the General Assembly of the Presbyterian Church in Ireland in 1953.

Education 
Davey was born on 24 June 1890 in Ballymena, Co. Antrim, the eldest child of the Rev Charles Davey, a Presbyterian minister, and his wife, Margaret. When Ernest was one the family moved to Belfast. He attended both Methodist College Belfast and Campbell College before graduating in 1912 from King's College, Cambridge.

Theologian and historian 
From 1917 until his death in 1960 he was on the staff of the Presbyterian college, in Belfast, variously occupying the four chairs of church history; biblical literature and Hellenistic Greek; Hebrew and Old Testament; and New Testament language, literature, and theology.

References

1890 births
1960 deaths
Presbyterian ministers from Northern Ireland
People from Ballymena
People educated at Methodist College Belfast
Moderators of the Presbyterian Church in Ireland